A leadership election was held by the People's Justice Party (PKR) in Malaysia on 26 May 2007. It was won by incumbent President of PKR, Wan Azizah Wan Ismail.

Central Executive Committee election results
[ Source]

Permanent Chairman

Deputy Permanent Chairman

President

Deputy President

Vice Presidents

Central Executive Committee Members

References

2007 elections in Malaysia
People's Justice Party leadership election
People's Justice Party leadership elections